Carlia insularis, the Kimberley islands rainbow-skink, is a species of skink. It is endemic to the islands of the Bonaparte Archipelago in the Kimberley region of Western Australia. It measures  in snout–vent length.

References

Carlia
Endemic fauna of Australia
Skinks of Australia
Reptiles of Western Australia
Reptiles described in 2017
Taxa named by Ana C. Afonso Silva
Taxa named by Natali Santos
Taxa named by Huw A. Ogilvie
Taxa named by Craig Moritz